The 1932 United States presidential election in New Hampshire took place on November 8, 1932, as part of the 1932 United States presidential election which was held throughout all contemporary 48 states. Voters chose four representatives, or electors to the Electoral College, who voted for president and vice president. 

New Hampshire voted for the Republican nominee, incumbent President Herbert Hoover of California, over the Democratic nominee, Governor Franklin D. Roosevelt of New York. Hoover's running mate was incumbent Vice President Charles Curtis of Kansas, while Roosevelt ran with incumbent Speaker of the House John Nance Garner of Texas.

Hoover won New Hampshire by a narrow margin of 1.43%. With 50.42% of the popular vote, it was Hoover’s fifth strongest state in the nation behind Vermont, Maine, Pennsylvania and Delaware. 

New Hampshire was 1 of only 6 states, four of them in New England, which voted to re-elect the embattled Republican incumbent Hoover, who was widely unpopular over his failure to adequately address the Great Depression.

Results

Results by county

See also
 United States presidential elections in New Hampshire

References

New Hampshire
1932
1932 New Hampshire elections